The H.E. Snyder House is a historic two-story house in Columbus, Nebraska. It was built in 1928 by George Johnsen I, and designed by architect Edward J. Sessinghaus. It has been listed on the National Register of Historic Places since July 10, 1986.

References

		
National Register of Historic Places in Platte County, Nebraska
Houses completed in 1928
1928 establishments in Nebraska